Calochortus monophyllus is a North American species of flowering plants in the lily family known by the common name yellow star-tulip.

Calochortus monophyllus is endemic to California.  It is found in the foothill Interior oak woodland and yellow pine forest habitats of the Sierra Nevada and southernmost Cascades in California, from Shasta County to Tulare County.

Description
Calochortus monophyllus is a perennial herb producing a slender, sometimes branched stem up to about 20 centimeters tall. The basal leaf is 10 to 30 centimeters in length and does not wither at flowering. There may be smaller leaves located along the stem.

The inflorescence bears 1 to 6 erect, bell-shaped flowers. Each flower has three pointed sepals and three more rounded petals, all bright to deep yellow. The petals may have some dark reddish spotting at the bases and are coated densely with yellow hairs on the inner surfaces.

The fruit is a winged capsule one or two centimeters long.

References

External links 
 
 Jepson Manual Treatment of Calochortus monophyllus
 United States Department of Agriculture Plants Profile for Calochortus monophyllus (yellow star tulip)
 Calphotos Photos gallery, University of California @ Berkeley: Calochortus monophyllus

monophyllus
Endemic flora of California
Flora of the Cascade Range
Plants described in 1849
Flora of the Sierra Nevada (United States)
Natural history of the California chaparral and woodlands